Keren Ann is the fifth studio album by French musician Keren Ann, and her third English-language album. The album was released on 23 April 2007 in France by Delabel and EMI. It was released on 8 May 2007 in the United States by Blue Note Records.

Critical reception 

In his review for MSN Music, music critic Robert Christgau cited "Lay Your Head Down" and "It Ain't No Crime" as highlights and quipped that it was "music to pretend you're having sophisticated casual sex to, only remember -- you're not actually that sophisticated". Other reviews were more positive; NPR called the album "gorgeous."

Track listing

Charts

References 

Keren Ann albums
2007 albums
Blue Note Records albums